LLR may refer to:

 LLR 81mm, a type of mortar used by the French Army
 Lars Løkke Rasmussen, a Danish politician from Venstre, who served as Prime Minister 2009-2011 and again 2015-2019
 Lender of last resort, banking term
 Loan Loss Reserve, banking term
 Local Light Rum, a regional rum, freely available, predominantly found in tropical, sub-tropical locales
 Leukaemia & Lymphoma Research
 Lloyd's Law Reports
 Log-likelihood ratio
 Lucas–Lehmer–Riesel test, an algorithm to find the primality of a number of the form k*2n-1
 Lunar laser ranging